Afektiven Naboj was one of the two punk rock bands (the other being Filter) formed in 1979 by the guitar player Klime Kovaceski and Goran Trajkoski, now an eminent musician from North Macedonia, who rose to international prominence as a frontman of the group Anastasia featured on the soundtrack album for the Academy Award-nominated Milčo Mančevski's film Before the Rain.

See also
Mizar
Padot na Vizantija
Punk rock in Yugoslavia

External links
"Mizar - 20 years after" by Miodrag Mišolić at the Mizar Official Website feat. Goran Trajkovski's biography 

Yugoslav punk rock groups
Macedonian musical groups
Musical groups established in 1979
Macedonian rock music groups
Macedonian punk rock groups
Macedonian post-punk music groups